Ruda  is a deity that was of paramount importance in the Arab pantheon of gods worshipped by the North Arabian tribes of pre-Islamic Arabia. 

He is first mentioned in the annals of Esarhaddon in the early 7th century BCE. He served as a protective deity. According to modern scholarly interpretations, Ruda was a moon deity.

Etymology 
The etymology of his name gives the meaning "well disposed" an indication of his function as a protective deity.

Attestations

Pre-Islamic era 
The oldest reference to Ruda is found in the annals of Esarhaddon who ruled over the Assyrian empire from 681 to 669 BC. The name is transliterated into Latin script  from the original Akkadian as Ru-ul-da-a-a-ú and he is mentioned among the gods of the Arabs.

Known as Arsu among the Palmyrenes, in a later Aramaic inscription, Arsu/Ruda is paired with the Syrian god Resheph, a protective deity for his worshippers from the 3rd millennium BC.

Inscriptions in a North Arabian dialect found in the region of Najd refer to Ruda and other gods of the Arab pantheon, providing evidence of how all things good and bad were attributed to the agency of gods. Examples of such inscriptions referring to Ruda include, "by Ruda are we" and "by Ruda is weeping".

Islamic era 
Ruda is mentioned in Hisham ibn al-Kalbi's Book of Idols. The name Abd-Ruda was said to be known at the time. Al-Kalbi reports that some traditionists relate Ruda to a temple belonging to the Banu Rabi’ah ibn Sa’d ibn Zayd 
ibn Manat tribe. During the early days of Islam, the temple was destroyed.

Scholarly interpretations 

Dierk Lange writes that Ruda formed part of a trinity of gods worshipped by the Assyrian-attested Yumu´il confederation of northern Arabian tribes, which he identifies with the Ishmaelites. According to Lange, Ruda was the moon deity, Nuha the sun deity, and Atarsamain the main deity was associated with Venus.   

A trinity of gods representing the sun, moon and Venus is also found among the peoples of the South Arabian kingdoms of Awsan, Ma'in, Qataban and Hadramawt between the 9th and 4th centuries BC. There, the deity associated with Venus was Astarte, the sun deity was Yam, and moon deity was variously called Wadd, Amm and Sin.

See also 
Orotalt
Dushara
Arsu

References

Bibliography

 (at Google Books)

Arab history
Arabian gods
Stellar gods
Lunar gods